The Red Canvas is a martial arts drama about a ruthless Mixed Martial Arts tournament. It is the first film shot and completed on the Red One 4k camera. The film stars Ernie Reyes, Jr.

Plot 
Johnny Sanchez (Ernie Reyes, Jr.) has a troubled past which manifests in the dissonance between him and his family, particularly with his father and son. As Johnny gets released from prison, his father's garage is going to be shut down. The only way to save it is to fight in the Red Canvas tournament, an MMA event. Amidst preparing for an opponent who can't be defeated, Johnny must deal with the turmoil of his family and answer for mistakes of the past.

Cast 
Ernie Reyes Jr.
Frank Shamrock
John Savage
George Takei
Lee Reyes
María Conchita Alonso
Ernie Reyes, Sr.
Ki Reyes
Destiny Reyes
Margie Betke
Kathy Long
Dan Severn
Tyson Griffin
Jermaine Andre
Chris Casamassa
Fernanda Romero
Sara Downing
Gray Maynard
Tony Thompson
Jean Claude Leuyer
Vic Chao
Shonie Carter
Jessiah Rueckert
Leslie Garza
Martin C. Alvillar
Lisa Canning
T.J. Quicksilver
Arnold Chon
Ving Rhames

Awards 

Action on Film Festival 2008 Best Picture
Action on Film Festival 2008 Male Action Performer of the Year - Ernie Reyes Jr.
Action on Film Festival 2008 Best Feature Soundtrack
Action on Film Festival 2008 Best Action Sequence Martial Arts
Action on Film Festival 2008 Best Feature Supporting Actor - John Savage

References

External links
 

2009 films
American martial arts films
Mixed martial arts films
Underground fighting films
2000s English-language films
2000s American films